Sergio Ferrer Marrero (born January 29, 1951) is a former Major League Baseball shortstop.

Minnesota Twins
Ferrer was born in Santurce, Puerto Rico, and signed with the Los Angeles Dodgers at nineteen years old. After three seasons in their farm system, in which he batted .280 with nine home runs and 121 runs batted in, he was selected by the Minnesota Twins from the Albuquerque Dukes in the Rule 5 draft on December 3, 1973.

Ferrer made the Twins out of Spring training , and immediately made an impact on his new club. In the season opener, he went two-for-five with two runs scored. The second came in the eleventh inning, when the speedy Ferrer scored from second base on a deep sacrifice fly to centerfield by Larry Hisle. He spent the first two months of the season as the Twins' starting shortstop, batting a respectable .281 and scoring twelve runs in the lead-off spot of the Twins' batting order, however, his inconsistent fielding led Twins manager Frank Quilici to give the starting shortstop job back to incumbent Danny Thompson. He was optioned to the triple A Tacoma Twins in late May, but his glove showed no improvement, and he remained in the minors for the rest of the season.

He got most of his playing time early in the season backing up Hall of Famer Rod Carew at second, but the switch hitter was soon moved into a platoon with Thompson at short. It proved effective, as Ferrer batted .333 against right-handed pitchers. Regardless, he was optioned back to Tacoma at the start of June much to the dismay of Carew, who openly expressed his unhappiness with this decision. After the season, he was traded to the Philadelphia Phillies for catcher Larry Cox.

New York Mets
With All-Stars Larry Bowa and Dave Cash in the Phillies' middle infield, Ferrer was unable to crack the major league roster, and spent the  season in triple A. Following Cash's departure via free agency, Ferrer went into Spring training  battling Ted Sizemore for the job at second base. When Sizemore won the job, Ferrer was dealt to the New York Yankees for outfielder Kerry Dineen. After one season with the triple A Syracuse Chiefs, he went cross-town to the New York Mets in exchange for third baseman Roy Staiger at the Winter Meetings on December 9, 1977.

When starting shortstop Tim Foli tore the outer ligament on his left knee early in the  season, Ferrer saw his first major league action in nearly three years. Unfortunately for Ferrer, Mets manager Joe Torre opted to shift second baseman Doug Flynn to short, and added Bobby Valentine to his starting line-up at second rather than giving playing time to Ferrer. He appeared in 37 games for the Mets, mostly as a pinch runner or late inning defensive replacement. Once Foli returned from the disabled list, Ferrer was optioned back to triple A Tidewater. He returned to the club in late July, but his role didn't change much. His stint with the Mets in  proved even less eventful; he appeared in 32 games and logged just nine plate appearances.

Liga Mexicana de Béisbol
Midway through the  season, Ferrer was released by the Mets. He briefly played minor league ball with the Cincinnati Reds before heading to Mexico to play in the Mexican League, where he played through . In , he played for the St. Petersburg Pelicans and St. Lucie Legends in the Senior Professional Baseball Association.

References

External links

Sergio Ferrer at Ultimate Mets Database

Major League Baseball shortstops
Minnesota Twins players
New York Mets players
Indianapolis Indians players
Daytona Beach Dodgers players
Oklahoma City 89ers players
Tacoma Twins players
Tidewater Tides players
Bakersfield Dodgers players
Syracuse Chiefs players
El Paso Dodgers players
People from Santurce, Puerto Rico
Waterbury Dodgers players
St. Petersburg Pelicans players
St. Lucie Legends players
Major League Baseball players from Puerto Rico
1951 births
Living people
Plataneros de Tabasco players
Piratas de Campeche players
Petroleros de Poza Rica players
Puerto Rican expatriate baseball players in Mexico